San Miguel Chapel, is a Spanish colonial mission church in Santa Fe, New Mexico. Originally built around 1610, it is often referred to as the oldest church in the United States (excluding Puerto Rico). The church was rebuilt twice, once in the mid to late 17th century, and again in 1710 following the Pueblo Revolt. In both cases earlier pieces of the building may have been reused, though it is unclear to what extent. The wooden reredos, which includes a wooden statue of Saint Michael dating back to at least 1709, was added in 1798.

The church is a contributing property in the Barrio De Analco Historic District, which is a U.S. National Historic Landmark. As of 2020, weekly Mass is still offered at the chapel on Sundays.

History

The original San Miguel church was probably built shortly after the founding of Santa Fe in 1610 and was the first church in the new settlement. It was built across the Santa Fe River from the villa proper in an area referred to as the Barrio de Analco, which was inhabited mainly by native people including some Tlaxcalans who had accompanied the Spanish settlers from Mexico. Since missionary work was a priority for the Spaniards, they built a church to serve this population before building their own Parroquia or parish church near the Plaza. In 1630, Alonso de Benavides reported,

The San Miguel Chapel was first mentioned in writing in 1628, indicating it was in use at that point. The original San Miguel Chapel was probably smaller than the present structure, with a rectangular apse, a slightly raised sanctuary, and a simple front elevation with no towers. The surviving foundations were excavated and studied by Bruce Ellis and Stanley Stubbs in 1955. In 1640, escalating conflict between Governor Luis de Rosas and the Franciscan missionaries who ran the church in New Mexico led to all of the Franciscans being expelled from Santa Fe, and the mission was partially or completely dismantled. De Rosas was later jailed and the Franciscans were able to return and rebuild the mission. It was damaged again in the Pueblo Revolt of 1680, when the Pueblo people rose up in a coordinated rebellion to drive the Spanish from New Mexico.

When Diego de Vargas led the Spanish back into Santa Fe in 1692, he found the mission burned but reparable. According to his official report, dated December 18, 1693,

 A more thorough rebuilding was undertaken in 1710 under the direction of Don Agustín Flores Vergara, who is named on the main beam supporting the choir loft along with the governor at the time, the Marquis de la Peñuela. The church was probably rebuilt on the same foundations and had the same layout as the earlier building, except that the apse was apparently changed from rectangular to trapezoidal. San Miguel was visited in 1776 by Fray Atanasio Domínguez, who wrote a thorough description:
 

At some point after Domínguez' visit, possibly in the 1830s, the present bell tower was added to the front of the church. By the time of the American occupation in 1846, masses were being held in the church only twice a year. The top levels of the tower collapsed during a storm in 1872 and by the 1880s the entire structure was in poor condition. In 1881, the Archdiocese of Santa Fe sold the little-used building to the Christian Brothers who operated the adjacent St. Michael's College. Under their ownership, the church was restored in 1887, rebuilding the bell tower and stabilizing the walls with stone buttresses. This project gave the building a more European appearance, adding arched openings and a pitched metal roof to the front elevation. These elements were later removed in 1955 during the most recent remodeling of the church.

Architecture
San Miguel Mission is constructed from adobe, with a single rectangular nave and a trapezoidal apse. The ceiling is supported by wooden vigas, of which two are square and are thought to date to 1710, while the remainder are round and are newer replacements. A clerestory above the sanctuary and a high window in the south wall provide light inside the church. The choir loft is supported by a heavy, corbeled beam spanning the width of the nave which in turn supports 13 perpendicular carved beams. The main beam is inscribed:

The front elevation of the church faces west and has a central bell tower with a single small window and a larger open void directly above the main entrance. The building is supported by five stone buttresses added in 1887, two on the front and three on the north side. To the south of the nave are a sacristy, robing room, and storage and residence areas.

Reredos

The wooden reredos or altar screen dates to 1798 and is said to be the work of an unnamed artisan known as the "Laguna Santero" who was active in New Mexico between 1796 and 1808. The screen is flanked by large Solomonic columns. A niche in the center of the reredos, with its own small pair of columns, contains a wooden statue of St. Michael the Archangel wielding a sword. The statue originated in Mexico in 1709 and has been in place at least since 1776, when it was mentioned in Domínguez' inventory of the church. Directly above the statue is a large painting of Jesus from the mid-18th century which was found behind the altar screen during the 1955 renovations. At the top center is a 1745 painting of St. Michael attributed to Bernardo de Miera y Pacheco. Around these two paintings are four oval oil paintings on canvas, which are Mexican and date to the early 18th century. Clockwise from top left, they depict St. Teresa of Ávila, St. Gertrude, St. Louis, and St. Francis of Assisi. The entire reredos was painted over at some point but was later restored.

On either side of the reredos are two paintings depicting the Annunciation, "believed to be the work of one of the disciples of Bartolomé Esteban Murillo". In the early 20th century, these paintings were falsely attributed to Cimabue and claimed to date from 1287.

Bell
Another notable object associated with the church is the bell that hung in the bell tower prior to 1872, which is still on display inside the building. The bell is mostly copper, weighs , and bears the legend 

The unlikely date of 1356 attracted attention from historians and the public. The San Miguel bell and the similar Maria Josefa bell, dated 1355, were claimed to be the oldest bells in the United States. This was debunked in 1914 by Benjamin Read, who located an elderly man who remembered the bell being cast in Santa Fe and confirmed that the correct date was 1856, not 1356. Furthermore, the bell is stylistically dissimilar to actual 14th century church bells, which would have been inscribed in Latin and dated using Roman numerals. The unlikelihood of two such large and heavy bells being brought from Europe when locally made bells were available has also been noted. Casting defects were probably responsible for the 8 appearing as a 3.

See also
 List of churches in the Roman Catholic Archdiocese of Santa Fe
Oldest buildings in the United States
Oldest churches in the United States
Camino Real de Tierra Adentro

References

External links 

Roman Catholic churches in Santa Fe, New Mexico
Historic American Buildings Survey in New Mexico
History of Santa Fe County, New Mexico
National Historic Landmarks in New Mexico
Churches on the National Register of Historic Places in New Mexico
Roman Catholic churches in New Mexico
Spanish-American culture in Santa Fe, New Mexico
Spanish missions in New Mexico
18th-century Roman Catholic church buildings in the United States
National Register of Historic Places in Santa Fe, New Mexico
Roman Catholic chapels in the United States
Adobe churches in New Mexico